

Dieter Misgeld is a retired professor in the department of Theory and Policy Studies at the Ontario Institute for Studies in Education (OISE), University of Toronto. He is known for his research on social theory, human rights, political philosophy, hermeneutics and the philosophy of Jürgen Habermas and Hans-Georg Gadamer.

Bibliography
 Hans-Georg Gadamer, Dieter Misgeld, Graeme Nicholson (1992). Hans-Georg Gadamer on Education, Poetry, and History. New York: SUNY.
  Modern German Sociology, edited by Volker Meja, Dieter Misgeld, and Nico Stehr. New York: Columbia University Press.

See also
 Philosophy in Canada
 Graeme Nicholson
 Muzi Epifani

References

External links
 The Office for Public Education (Current Academics)

20th-century Canadian philosophers
21st-century Canadian philosophers
Hermeneutists
Phenomenologists
Continental philosophers
Political philosophers
Philosophy academics
Gadamer scholars
Habermas scholars
Academic staff of the University of Toronto
Living people
Heidelberg University alumni
Year of birth missing (living people)